Joseph Iléo (15 September 1921 – 19 September 1994), subsequently Zairianised as Sombo Amba Iléo, was a politician in the Democratic Republic of the Congo and was prime minister for two periods.

Early life
Joseph Iléo was born on 15 September 1921. In 1956, he was one of the authors of Manifeste de la Conscience Africaine, which demanded the right of Africans to self-rule.

In 1958, he was one of the founders of the Mouvement National Congolais. When the movement split a year later, he joined the camp led by Albert Kalonji.

Career

Iléo was voted into the Senate and then voted its president in June 1960. Upon the dismissal of then-prime minister Patrice Lumumba, Iléo was declared prime minister by Congolese president, Joseph Kasa-Vubu, on 5 September 1960. He held the post until 20 September 1960.

Under Kasa-Vubu's successor, Justin Marie Bomboko, Ileo served as Minister of Information. He was again declared prime minister on 9 February 1961. He remained in this post until 2 August 1961.

From March to December 1979 Iléo served as President of the National Assembly.

Later life 
In April 1990, he founded the Parti Démocrate Social Chrétien, serving as chairman of the party until his death. He died on 19 September 1994, aged 73.

References

1921 births
1994 deaths
People from Kinshasa
Presidents of the Senate (Democratic Republic of the Congo)
Presidents of the National Assembly (Democratic Republic of the Congo)
Prime Ministers of the Democratic Republic of the Congo
Mouvement National Congolais politicians
Democratic Social Christian Party politicians
People of the Congo Crisis
Évolués